Marge Baliff Simon (born 1942) is an American artist and a writer of speculative poetry and fiction.

Biography

Early life 
Marge Simon was born in Bethesda, Maryland, but grew up in Boulder, Colorado.

Education and career 
She received her BA and MA degrees from the University of Northern Colorado, and then continued her studies at the Art Center College of Design. Deciding against a career as a commercial artist, she began working as an art teacher in elementary schools instead.

In the mid-1980s, Simon began writing and illustrating for the small press and went on to become an award-winning writer. Simon's poems, short fiction, and illustrations have appeared in hundreds of publications, including Amazing Stories, Nebula Awards 32, Strange Horizons, The Pedestal Magazine, Chizine, Niteblade, Vestal Review, and Daily Science Fiction.

Simon is a former president of the Small Press Writers and Artists Organization and of the Science Fiction & Fantasy Poetry Association (SFPA). She is additionally a former editor of  Star*Line, the SFPA's bimonthly journal. 

In 2013, Simon began editing the column "Blood and Spades: Poets of the Dark Side" for the monthly newsletter of the Horror Writers Association (HWA). She serves as the Chair of the HWA Board of Trustees.

Marriage 
Simon lives in Ocala, Florida, with her husband, writer Bruce Boston, with whom she sometimes collaborates.

Published works

Poetry collections
Poets of the Fantastic (co-ed. with Steve Eng). AE Press, 1993
Eonian Variations. Dark Regions, 1995
Night Smoke with Bruce Boston, ebook. Miniature Sun/Quixsilver, 2003 (Bram Stoker Award finalist)
Artist of Antithesis, ebook. Miniature Sun, 2004 (Bram Stoker Award finalist)
Vectors: A Week in the Death of a Planet with Charlee Jacob. Dark Regions, 2007 (Bram Stoker Award winner) 
Night Smoke with Bruce Boston, expanded print edition of the 2003 ebook. Kelp Queen Press, 2007
Uneathly Delights. Sam's Dot Publishing, 2011
The Mad Hattery. Elektrik Milk Bath Press, 2011
The Four Elements with Linda Addison, Rain Graves, and Charlee Jacob. Bad Moon Books, 2012
Dangerous Dreams with Sandy DeLuca. Elektrik Milk Bath Press, 2013
Vectors: A Week in the Death of a Planet with Charlee Jacob
Vampires, Zombies, and Wanton Souls
Sweet Poison with Mary A. Turzillo
Small Spirits: Dark Dolls 
Satan's Sweethearts with Mary A. Turzillo
War with Alessandro Manzetti

Poetry and fiction collections
Dragon Soup with Mary Turzillo. vanZeno Press, 2008
Legends of the Fallen Sky with Malcolm Deeley. Sam's Dot Publishing, 2008
City of a Thousand Gods with Malcolm Deeley. Sam's Dot Publishing, 2010

Fiction collections
Like Birds in the Rain. Sam's Dot Publishing, 2007
Christina's World. Sam's Dot Publishing, 2008
The Dragon's Dictionary with Mary Turzillo. Sam's Dot Publishing, 2010

Art
Gallery of color art at Strange Horizons.
Soho Galleries, black and white art.

Recognition 
Simon's poem "Variants of the Obsolete" won the 1996 Rhysling Award for speculative poetry in the Long category. Her poems “Shutdown” and “George Tecumseh Sherman’s Ghosts” placed first in the Short category of the Rhyslings in 2015 and 2017, respectively.

Simon's short-form poem "Blue Rose Buddha" won the 2012 Dwarf Stars Award.

Vectors: A Week in the Death of a Planet, written by Simon in collaboration with Charlee Jacob, won the Bram Stoker Award for best horror poetry collection in 2008. In 2012, Simon's collection Vampires, Zombies, and Wanton Souls was a recipient of the same award. 

Sweet Poison, co-written with Mary A. Turzillo, won the 2015 Elgin Award for best full-length speculative poetry collection. Simon's Small Spirits: Dark Dolls placed second in the full-length book category of the 2017 Elgins, and Satan's Sweethearts, another collaborative work with Turzillo, placed second in the 2018 Elgins. War, written by Simon in collaboration with Alessandro Manzetti, won the 2019 Elgin for full-length book.

In 2015, Simon was created a Grand Master of the Science Fiction & Fantasy Poetry Association in recognition of more than twenty years of contributions to the field of speculative verse.

References

External links
Marge Simon's website
Interview at Fear and Trembling

1942 births
20th-century American short story writers
21st-century American novelists
21st-century American short story writers
American science fiction writers
American women novelists
American women poets
American women short story writers
Living people
Rhysling Award for Best Long Poem winners
Women science fiction and fantasy writers
20th-century American women writers
21st-century American women writers